{{Speciesbox
|name = Roxburgh fig
|image = Ficus auriculata.jpg
|image_caption = 
|status = LC
|status_system = IUCN3.1
|status_ref = 
|parent = Ficus subg. Sycomorus
|taxon = Ficus auriculata
|authority = Lour.
| synonyms = Ficus sclerocarpa Griff.Ficus roxburghii Wall. ex Steud.Ficus rotundifolia Roxb.Ficus regia Miq.Ficus pomifera Wall. ex KingFicus oligodon Miq.Ficus hainanensis Merr. & ChunFicus imperialis G.W.Johnson & R.HoggFicus beipeiensis S.S.ChangCovellia macrophylla (Roxb. ex Sm.) Miq.
}}Ficus auriculata, the Roxburgh fig, is a type of fig tree, native to Asia, noted for its big and round leaves.

Description
Ficus auriculata is dioecious, with male and female flowers produced on separate individuals. It grows in forests in moist valleys.Ceratosolen emarginatus is the insect that helps to pollinate this plant.

Uses
The fresh fruit of this plant is consumed as food, and has diuretic, laxative and digestive regulating properties. Ficus auriculata'' is used as fodder in Nepal. It is least resistant to fire, but likes good sunlight.

Photo gallery

References

External links

auriculata
Flora of the Indian subcontinent
Flora of Indo-China
Flora of China
Dioecious plants
Taxa named by João de Loureiro